Roxana Castellanos Gómez (born 12 February 1973) is a Mexican actress and television host.

Biography 
Castellanos was born on 12 February 1973 in Monterrey, Nuevo León, Mexico. She is the daughter of Lorenzo Castellanos and Carmina Gómez. After completing her high school studies, she entered the CEA of Televisa. Her first job as an actress was in the series Papá soltero and in the telenovelas Volver a Empezar and Tú y yo. In 1998 she starred as Yadhira in La Mentira. She later appeared in the telenovelas Primer amor, a mil por hora, Alegrijes y rebujos and Amarte es mi pecado.

In 2004 she participated as a contestant in the reality show Big Brother VIP 3 (Part 2), which she won.

Filmography

Television

Awards and nominations

References

External links 
 

1973 births
Living people
Mexican telenovela actresses
Mexican television actresses
Mexican television presenters
Mexican television talk show hosts
Actresses from Monterrey
Singers from Monterrey
20th-century Mexican actresses
21st-century Mexican actresses
People from Monterrey
21st-century Mexican singers
21st-century Mexican women singers
Mexican women television presenters